St. John's East was a provincial electoral district for the House of Assembly of Newfoundland and Labrador, Canada. In 2011 there were 8,063 eligible voters living within the district. The district was abolished in 2015 as Newfoundland and Labrador reduced the number of districts. Portions of the district are now within the district of St. John's East-Quidi Vidi.

Prior to 1956, the district was larger and elected two MHAs.

Members of the House of Assembly
The district has elected the following Members of the House of Assembly:

For MHAs elected to the old St. John's East between 1956 and 1995 see Signal Hill-Quidi Vidi

St. John's Centre (1956-1995), St. John's East since 1995

Dual-Member District

Single-Member District

Election results

|-
 
|NDP
|George Murphy
|align="right"|2,766
|align="right"|52.11
|align="right"|+35.51
|-

|-

|}

|-

|-
 
|NDP
|Gemma Schlamp-Hickey
|align="right"|864
|align="right"|16.60
|align="right"|
|-

 
|NDP
|Bruce Clarke
|align="right"|864
|align="right"|14.54
|align="right"|

|-

|Independent
|Steve Durant
|align="right"|66
|align="right"|1.11
|align="right"|

 
|NDP
|Barry Darby
|align="right"|600
|align="right"|10.08
|align="right"|
|-

 
|NDP
|Sean Murray
|align="right"|796
|align="right"|12.94
|align="right"|
|-

 
|NDP
|Fraser March
|align="right"|874
|align="right"|
|align="right"|
|-

 
|NDP
|Vicky Silky
|align="right"|625
|align="right"|
|align="right"|
|-

 
|NDP
|Nina Patey
|align="right"|976
|align="right"|
|align="right"|
|-

 
|NDP
|Pobert Harry E. Cuff
|align="right"|293
|align="right"|
|align="right"|
|-

References

External links 
Website of the Newfoundland and Labrador House of Assembly

Newfoundland and Labrador provincial electoral districts
Politics of St. John's, Newfoundland and Labrador